Brian Michael Daubach (born February 11, 1972) is an American former Major League Baseball (MLB) player and current hitting coach for the Rochester Red Wings. During his playing career Daubach served as a first baseman, outfielder, and designated hitter.

Playing career
Daubach was selected by the Mets in the 17th round of the 1990 amateur draft.  He toiled for seven years in the Mets' minor league system without breaking through to the majors before being granted free agency. In , he signed with the Florida Marlins organization and  made his major league debut in 1998. Later he played for the Boston Red Sox (–) and Chicago White Sox.

During his time with the Red Sox, Daubach was involved in a bench-clearing brawl that occurred during a game between Boston and the Tampa Bay Devil Rays on August 29, 2000. During the fight, Daubach unintentionally injured teammate Lou Merloni, who would have to go to the hospital. As the game continued, Devil Rays pitchers would go on to throw at Daubach six times, hitting him twice. In all, eight members of the Devil Rays team were ejected from the game, which Boston won, with Red Sox pitcher Pedro Martínez nearly throwing a no-hitter.

He started  with the Norfolk Tides, a Triple-A affiliate of the Mets in the International League. On June 16, 2005, he finally made his debut with the club that drafted him fifteen years earlier. He played for the Memphis Redbirds, the AAA-affiliate of the St. Louis Cardinals in 2006.

Daubach's best seasons were with the Red Sox; he averaged 21 homers and 75 RBI per year, and gained a reputation as a "Dirt Dog" for his style of play. He later received a World Series ring as a member of the 2004 Boston Red Sox. In his seven-season major league career, he compiled a .259 batting average with 93 home runs and 333 RBI in 661 games.

On April 8, 2008 Daubach represented the 2004 World Champion Boston Red Sox during the ring ceremony for their 2007 Championship season.

Post-playing career
On June 30, 2008 Brian Daubach was named the hitting coach for the Nashua Pride, coaching his first game July 1.  Although the Pride went on to a losing season, Brian Daubach was named the manager of their successor team, the American Defenders of New Hampshire in November 2008.

Brian appeared on WEEI as one of the co-hosts of The Big Show and on Comcast cable for sports commentary.  He also appeared on Fox Sports Net in St. Louis when he covered the 2006 World Series between the Cardinals and the Tigers.

On November 9, 2010 Daubach was named as the minor-league manager of the Hagerstown, MD Suns, a Single-A affiliate of the Washington Nationals.

In December 2012, the Nationals organization named Daubach as manager of the Potomac Nationals, the team's high A affiliate.

In December 2013, he was named manager of the Harrisburg Senators, the team's Double-A affiliate.

In 2018 he was named as the hitting coach for the Syracuse Chiefs.

In 2021 he was named as the hitting coach for the Rochester Red Wings.

References

External links

, or Nashua Pride website, or Retrosheet, or Pelota Binaria (Venezuelan Winter League), or Minor League Splits and Situational Stats

1972 births
Living people
Baseball coaches from Illinois
Baseball players from Chicago
Binghamton Mets players
Boston Red Sox players
Capital City Bombers players
Charlotte Knights players
Chicago White Sox players
Florida Marlins players
Gulf Coast Mets players
Kingsport Mets players
Lowell Spinners players
Major League Baseball designated hitters
Major League Baseball first basemen
Major League Baseball replacement players
Memphis Redbirds players
Minor league baseball managers
Navegantes del Magallanes players
American expatriate baseball players in Venezuela
New York Mets players
Norfolk Tides players
Pawtucket Red Sox players
Pittsfield Mets players
Sportspeople from Belleville, Illinois
Sportspeople from Chicago
St. Lucie Mets players
Minor league baseball coaches
Syracuse Chiefs coaches